American Theater or American Theatre may refer to:

 Theater in the United States, about stage theater in the U.S.
 Camp Street Theatre, New Orleans, known as the American Theatre, the Old American Theatre, and the New American Theatre
 American Music Hall, Manhattan, known as American Theater until 1908
 Bowery Theatre, Manhattan, formerly also called the American Theatre
 Orpheum Theater (St. Louis), Missouri, formerly known as the American Theater
 American Theater (World War II), about military operations
 American Theatre (magazine)

See also
 American Theatre Hall of Fame, New York City, New York